The Mohmand Rifles is a paramilitary regiment forming part of the Frontier Corps Khyber Pakhtunkhwa (North) in Pakistan. The name alludes to the Mohmand tribe and the Mohmand Agency.

History
The regiment was raised in 1973. It maintained a low profile in its early years with only one incident in 1986, when one of its personnel was killed by firing from Afghanistan. By 1999 it was reported to have 2,330 personnel.

In the 21st century the regiment has been involved in combatting the insurgency in Khyber Pakhtunkhwa. However, it has had some negative consequences. The conduct of the regiment has been the subject of criticism from locals, for example by a tribal assembly in 2005. On 10 June 2008, several members of the regiment were killed at a border checkpoint in the Gora Prai airstrike by the United States military. In December 2008 three of its soldiers were among five dead after a bombing incident in the town of Shabqadar. Nonetheless, by 2010 the regiment claimed to have pushed the militants back and secured control of the majority of the Mohmand Agency.

The Rifles have also long been involved in anti-drug smuggling operations, although not always successfully. In 2011-2012, the unit received a number of drug testing kits, through a United Nations programme, to assist in their work against drug smuggling.

Units

 Headquarters Wing
 201 Wing
 202 Wing
 203 Wing

 204 Wing
 205 Wing
 206 Wing
 207 Wing

See also
 Gora Prai airstrike

References

Regiments of the Frontier Corps
Mohmand District
Frontier Corps Khyber Pakhtunkhwa (North)